International Bank (Liberia), Limited (IBLL) is a full-service bank based in Liberia.  The bank was created when the International Trust Company of Liberia created a commercial banking department in 1960.  In 2000 the International Trust Company became the International Bank.  It is headquartered in Monrovia with several locations throughout the country. International Bank extends a variety of banking services, including but not limited to: commercial and personal banking, commercial and personal loans, money transfer services, including wires, MoneyGram, Western Union, RIA, & Nobel, and payroll & tuition services.

Locations include Harbel, Harper, Pleebo,  Kakata, Caldwell, Paynesville, Sinkor, Camp Johnson Road, Vai Town, Broad Street, and the Monrovia Post offices.

See also
 Economy of Liberia
 List of banks in Liberia

References

Banks of Liberia
Companies based in Monrovia
1960 establishments in Liberia
Banks established in 1960